Jean-Jacques Guillet (born 16 October 1946) is a French politician.  He is mayor of Chaville.  He was the deputy for Hauts-de-Seine's 8th constituency in the National Assembly of France from 1993 to 2017, as a member of Rally for the Republic, Rally for France and then The Republicans. 

In 2019, he left The Republicans.

References

1946 births
Living people
Knights of the Ordre national du Mérite
The Republicans (France) politicians
Deputies of the 10th National Assembly of the French Fifth Republic
Deputies of the 11th National Assembly of the French Fifth Republic
Deputies of the 12th National Assembly of the French Fifth Republic
Deputies of the 13th National Assembly of the French Fifth Republic
Deputies of the 14th National Assembly of the French Fifth Republic
Lycée Condorcet alumni
University of Paris alumni
Sciences Po alumni
Mayors of places in Île-de-France
People from Clichy, Hauts-de-Seine